Dust Bunnies is the third album by the Dutch indie band Bettie Serveert, released in 1997.

Track listing 
"Geek" – 3:52
"The Link" – 3:09
"Musher" – 3:09
"Dust Bunny" – 2:12
"What Friends?" – 2:47
"Misery Galore" – 4:02
"Story in a Nutshell" – 1:10
"Sugar the Pill" – 4:00
"Rudder" – 2:45
"Pork & Beans" – 2:58
"Fallen Foster" – 3:57
"Co-coward" – 3:47
"Heaven" – 3:31

Personnel 

Herman Bunskoeke – bass
Berend Dubbe – drums
Bryce Goggin – producer, mixing
Scott Hull – mastering
Carol van Dijk – guitar, vocals
Peter Visser – guitar
David Voigt – mixing assistant, assistant producer

References 

1997 albums
Bettie Serveert albums
Beggars Banquet Records albums